The Easter hotspot is a volcanic hotspot located in the southeastern Pacific Ocean. The hotspot created the Sala y Gómez Ridge which includes Easter Island, Salas y Gómez Island and the Pukao Seamount which is at the ridge's young western edge. Easter Island, because of its tectonomagmatic features (low eruptive rate, scattered rift zones, and scarce lateral collapses), represents an end-member type of hotspot volcano in this chain.

The hotspot may also be responsible for the formation of the Tuamotu Archipelago, Line Islands, and the chain of seamounts lying in between.

See also 
 Easter Island § Geology
 Moai (seamount)

References

External links
 

Volcanism of Chile
Hotspots of the Pacific Ocean
Geography of Easter Island